Surendranath College for Women, established in 1948, is an undergraduate women's college in Sealdah, Kolkata, West Bengal, India. It is affiliated with the University of Calcutta. The college is recognized by the University Grants Commission (UGC). The crucial aim of this college is to give quality training to the ordinary students to make them confident. The college likewise gives free education to around 10% of the students who can't manage the cost of the small expense charged by the college. Giving important training to young women from poor families is the center mission of the college.

Mission 
This college endeavors energetically to confer to every one of their students, scholastic training as well as basic reasoning aptitudes, strong hard working attitudes, social abilities and a good moral code. It is their means to send the students out into the world with a graduation degree as well as with the characteristics of a decent person who can adapt effectively in the outside world and set herself an example to other people. Their aim is to make students independent, confident and empowered. Huge numbers of the young women who study in the school are from poor families from suburbs. Since the school is near one of the most significant terminal rural stations in the nation, most students travel daily from remote areas to the school.

Campus 
Their classes are held utilizing varying media cuts. Four LCD projectors, Smartboards, Wacom sheets, LCD screens and PCs are utilized for the classes to make it additionally intriguing and valuable for the students. Students' Common Room with the important framework was set up, aside from canteen space accessible to them. The new State-of-the-Art hall was finished in February 2011. It can accommodate 200 individuals and is outfitted with acoustics, projection and different offices. It was developed with help from MP LAD reserves, UGC awards and from the school's own assets. The air conditioned assembly room — named Gitanjali, one of Rabindranath Tagore's most significant manifestations — has furnished us with a critical asset to hold standard classes, meetings workshops. It likewise helps in our effort and augmentation exercises for the nearby network since there is no such office in the region. Various occasions for the nearby network have likewise been organized at the assembly room. The old office and some different rooms on the ground floor were dismantled to build the theater. Another office was developed with modern facilities for simpler connection with college students. It has enabled them to make ideal use of the regulatory staff and furthermore to give better support to the students by giving them better access. The school library is equipped with "Libsys" a software programme which manages the library. The booklist has been made digitalized and an online public access catalog was made accessible for the students for easier access to the library resources. A huge water cooler and purifier has been set-up for students at the canteen through assets from the MPLAD scheme. Following is a list of the facilities being provided by this college:

 An improved Library with latest Books and different services.
 Internet access to the students and instructors for scholarly motive. 
 Laboratories—IT (B.Com) journalism, geography, geology. 
 15 smart classrooms with the office of audio-visual projection. 
 A completely cooled and well-kept up Auditorium which can accommodate more than 300 individuals. 
 Students common room with the office of television and water refrigerator. 
 A well-outfitted gymnasium with an accomplished lady trainer. 
 Hassle free money store office or students can likewise utilize debit card for paying different sort of expenses (Such as Admission charges, Examination expenses). 
 A lovely garden kept up by NSS.
 A Hygienic yet Cheap Canteen.

Admission 
The Admission procedure is done completely in online mode. No physical presence of the candidate or any related individual will be required at college campus during the procedure of confirmation (as coordinated by the Department of Higher Education, Govt. of West Bengal vide G.O. No. 804-Edn (CS)/10M-95/14 dated: 13.05.19). Any off-base data gave in the Application Form or during whenever of the Admission procedure will prompt cancellation of Admission.

Departments 
The most recent revised syllabus set by Calcutta University has been adopted by the college. Creative instructing techniques and modern scientific hardware are utilized for teaching purpose. Following courses are offered here:

Science 
 Mathematics
 Statistics (General)

Arts and Commerce 
Bengali (Hons) 
English (Hons)
Sanskrit (Hons) 
Hindi (General) 
Urdu
History
Geography
Political Science
Philosophy
Economics
Education
Sociology (General) 
Journalism and Mass Communication (Hons)
Communicative English (Major)
Commerce (Hons)

Alumni 
Every year, customarily on the last working day before Christmas, the graduated classes of the college are welcomed for a get-together and apart from the festivities they are additionally engaged with placing their input for advancement of different offices in the college. The collaboration of old students and staff with the new students and staff advances the social legacy of the school. A small fund deposit has been produced by the graduated batches which is used in expanding the developmental activities. Some notable alumni are:

See also 
Surendranath Evening College
Surendranath Law College
Surendranath College
List of colleges affiliated to the University of Calcutta
Education in India
Education in West Bengal

References

External links 
 
 Admissions

Educational institutions established in 1948
University of Calcutta affiliates
Universities and colleges in Kolkata
Women's universities and colleges in West Bengal
1948 establishments in West Bengal